The Red Mill Museum Village, historically known as the Clinton Historical Museum, is an open-air museum located along the South Branch Raritan River at 56 Main Street in Clinton, New Jersey. It includes the historic Red Mill and the adjacent M. C. Mulligan & Sons Quarry. The museum is a private, non-profit organization, whose mission is to display the social, agricultural, and industrial heritage of Hunterdon County. The  site has 12 historic buildings. Both the mill and the quarry are listed on the National Register of Historic Places and are part of the Clinton Historic District.

History
Starting in 1960, five local residents, known as the Red Mill Five, began to acquire property to form the museum. They were Monroe F. DeMott, Cyrus R. Fox, Ralph Howard, Robert Lechner, and the artist James R. Marsh. They acquired the Red Mill for $15,000. The museum opened to the public in 1963. Marsh bought the adjoining quarry in 1964 and donated it to the museum. The full museum then opened in 1965. On October 9, 1965, the James Randall Marsh Historical Park was dedicated at the museum. The Bunker Hill School House, built , was moved here in 1974 from Alexandria Township.

Events
The museum has been the site for the annual Black Potatoe Music Festival, founded by Matt Angus.

Gallery

See also
 List of museums in New Jersey

References

External links
 
 

Clinton, New Jersey
Museums in Hunterdon County, New Jersey
Open-air museums in New Jersey